Abrial is a surname. Notable people with the surname include:

 André Joseph Abrial (1750 - 1828), French politician
  (born 1783), general police chief in Lyon under Napoleon I
 Jean-Marie Charles Abrial (1879-1962), French admiral during World War Two
 Georges Abrial (1898-1970), French aerodynamicist
 Jean-Raymond Abrial (born 1938), French computer scientist and creator of the Z notation and the B-Method
 General Stéphane Abrial, French air force general
 , French guitarist

See also
Abrial A-12 Bagoas, experimental glider
Abrial A-3 Oricou, two-seat touring airplane
Abrial A-2 Vautour, single-seat sailplane